Senator Brackett may refer to:

Bert Brackett (born 1944), Idaho State Senate
Edgar T. Brackett (1853–1924), New York State Senate